The Aarne–Thompson–Uther Index (ATU Index) is a catalogue of folktale types used in folklore studies. The ATU Index is the product of a series of revisions and expansions by an international group of scholars: originally composed in German by Finnish folklorist Antti Aarne (1910), the index was translated into English, revised, and expanded by American folklorist Stith Thompson (1928, 1961), and later further revised and expanded by German folklorist Hans-Jörg Uther (2004). The ATU Index, along with Thompson's Motif-Index of Folk-Literature (1932) - with which it is used in tandem, is an essential tool for folklorists.

Definition of tale type
In The Folktale, Thompson defines a tale type as follows:
A type is a traditional tale that has an independent existence. It may be told as a complete narrative and does not depend for its meaning on any other tale. It may indeed happen to be told with another tale, but the fact that it may be told alone attests its independence. It may consist of only one motif or of many.

Predecessors 
Austrian consul Johann Georg von Hahn devised a preliminary analysis of some 44 tale "formulae" as introduction to his book of Greek and Albanian folktales, published in 1864.

Reverend Sabine Baring-Gould, in 1866, translated von Hahn's list and expanded to 52 tale types, which he called "Story Radicals". Folklorist Joseph Jacobs expanded the list to seventy tale types and published it as Appendix C in Charlotte Sophia Burne and Laurence Gomme's Handbook of Folk-Lore.

Before the edition of Antti Aarne's first folktale classification, Astrid Lunding translated Svend Grundtvig's system of folktale classification. This catalogue consisted of 134 types, mostly based on Danish folktale compilations in comparison to international collections available at the time by other folklorists, such as the Brothers Grimm's and Emmanuel Cosquin's.

History 
Antti Aarne was a student of Julius Krohn and his son Kaarle Krohn. Aarne developed the historic-geographic method of comparative folkloristics, and developed the initial version of what became the Aarne–Thompson tale type index for classifying folktales, first published in 1910 as Verzeichnis der Märchentypen ("List of Fairy Tale Types"). The system was based on identifying motifs and the repeated narrative ideas that can be seen as the building-blocks of traditional narrative; its scope was European.

The American folklorist Stith Thompson revised Aarne's classification system in 1928, enlarging its scope, while also translating it from German into English. In doing so, he created the "AT number system" (also referred to as "AaTh system") which remained in use through the second half of the century. Another edition with further revisions by Thompson followed in 1961. According to American folklorist D. L. Ashliman, "The Aarne–Thompson system catalogues some 2500 basic plots from which, for countless generations, European and Near Eastern storytellers have built their tales".

The AT-number system was updated and expanded in 2004 with the publication of The Types of International Folktales: A Classification and Bibliography by German folklorist Hans-Jörg Uther. Uther noted that many of the earlier descriptions were cursory and often imprecise, that many "irregular types" are in fact old and widespread, and that "emphasis on oral tradition" often obscured "older, written versions of the tale types". To remedy these shortcomings Uther developed the Aarne–Thompson–Uther classification (ATU) system and included more tales from eastern and southern Europe as well as "smaller narrative forms" in this expanded listing. He also put the emphasis of the collection more explicitly on international folktales, removing examples whose attestation was limited to one ethnic group.

System
The Aarne–Thompson Tale Type Index divides tales into sections with an AT number for each entry. The names given are typical, but usage varies; the same tale type number may be referred to by its central motif or by one of the variant folktales of that type, which can also vary, especially when used in different countries and cultures. The name does not have to be strictly literal for every folktale. For example, The Cat as Helper (545B) also includes tales where a fox helps the hero. Closely related folktales are often grouped within a type. For example, tale types 400–424 all feature brides or wives as the primary protagonist, for instance The Quest for a Lost Bride (400) or the Animal Bride (402). Subtypes within a tale type are designated by the addition of a letter to the AT number, for instance: tale 510, Persecuted Heroine (renamed in Uther's revision as Cinderella and Peau d'Âne ["Cinderella and Donkey Skin"]), has subtypes 510A, Cinderella, and 510B, Catskin (renamed in Uther's revision as Peau d'Asne [also "Donkey Skin"]). 

As an example, the entry for 510A in the ATU index (with cross-references to motifs in Thompson's Motif-Index of Folk Literature in square brackets, and variants in parentheses) reads:
510A Cinderella. (Cenerentola, Cendrillon, Aschenputtel.) A young woman is mistreated by her stepmother and stepsisters [S31, L55] and has to live in the ashes as a servant. When the sisters and the stepmother go to a ball (church), they give Cinderella an impossible task (e.g. sorting peas from ashes), which she accomplishes with the help of birds [B450]. She obtains beautiful clothing from a supernatural being [D1050.1, N815] or a tree that grows on the grave of her deceased mother [D815.1, D842.1, E323.2] and goes unknown to the ball. A prince falls in love with her [N711.6, N711.4], but she has to leave the ball early [C761.3]. The same thing happens on the next evening, but on the third evening, she loses one of her shoes [R221, F823.2].
The prince will marry only the woman whom the shoe fits [H36.1]. The stepsisters cut pieces off their feet in order to make them fit into the shoe [K1911.3.3.1], but a bird calls attention to this deceit. Cinderella, who had first been hidden from the prince, tries on the shoe and it fits her. The prince marries her.

Combinations: This type is usually combined with episodes of one or more other types, esp. 327A, 403, 480, 510B, and also 408, 409, 431, 450, 511, 511A, 707, and 923.
Remarks: Documented by Basile, Pentamerone (I,6) in the 17th century.
The entry concludes, like others in the catalogue, with a long list of references to secondary literature on the tale, and variants of it.

Critical response
In his essay "The Motif-Index and the Tale Type Index: A Critique", American folklorist Alan Dundes explains that the Aarne–Thompson indexes are some of the "most valuable tools in the professional folklorist's arsenal of aids for analysis".

Furthermore, Propp contended that using a "macro-level" analysis means that the stories that share motifs might not be classified together, while stories with wide divergences may be grouped under one tale type because the index must select some features as salient. He also observed that while the distinction between animal tales and tales of the fantastic was basically correct — no one would classify "Tsarevitch Ivan, the Fire Bird and the Gray Wolf" as an animal tale just because of the wolf — it did raise questions because animal tales often contained fantastic elements, and tales of the fantastic often contained animals; indeed a tale could shift categories if a peasant deceived a bear rather than a devil.

In describing the motivation for his work, Uther presents several criticisms of the original index. He points out that Thompson's focus on oral tradition sometimes neglects older versions of stories, even when written records exist, that the distribution of stories is uneven (with Eastern and Southern European as well as many other regions' folktale types being under-represented), and that some included folktale types have dubious importance. Similarly, Thompson had noted that the tale type index might well be called The Types of the Folk-Tales of Europe, West Asia, and the Lands Settled by these Peoples. However, Alan Dundes notes that in spite of the flaws of tale type indexes (e. g., typos, redundancies, censorship, etc.; p. 198), "they represent the keystones for the comparative method in folkloristics, a method which despite postmodern naysayers ... continues to be the hallmark of international folkloristics" (p. 200).

Author Pete Jordi Wood claims that topics related to homosexuality have been excluded intentionally from the type index. Similarly, folklorist Joseph P. Goodwin states that Thompson omitted "much of the extensive body of sexual and 'obscene' material", and that - as of 1995 - "topics like homosexuality are still largely excluded from the type and motif indexes."

In regards to the geographical criticism, it has been said that the ATU folktype index seems to concentrate on Europe and North Africa, or overrepresent Eurasia and North America. The catalogue appears to ignore or underrepresent, for example, Central Asia, a region from where, some scholars propose, may emerge new folktale types, previously not contemplated by the original catalogue, such as 's The Captive Khan and the Clever Daughter-in-Law (and variants) and The travelling girl and her helpful siblings, or Woman's Magical Horse, as named by researcher Veronica Muskheli of the University of Washington.

In regards to the typological classification, some folklorists and tale comparativists have acknowledged singular tale types that, due to their own characteristics, would merit their own type. However, such tales have not been listed in the international folktale system, yet they exist in regional or national classifications.

Use in folkloristics

A quantitative study, published by folklorist Sara Graça da Silva and anthropologist Jamshid J. Tehrani in 2016, tried to evaluate the time of emergence for the "Tales of Magic" (ATU 300–ATU 749), based on a phylogenetic model. They found four of them to belong to the Proto-Indo-European (PIE) stratum of magic tales:

 ATU 328 The Boy Steals Ogre's Treasure (= Jack and the Beanstalk and Thirteen)
 ATU 330 The Smith and the Devil (KHM 81a)
 ATU 554 The Grateful Animals (= The White Snake, KHM 17 and The Queen Bee, KHM 62)

Ten more magic tales were found to be current throughout the Western branch of the Indo-European languages, comprising the main European language families derived from PIE (i. e. Balto-Slavic, Germanic, Italic and Celtic):

 ATU 311 Rescue by Sister (= Fitcher's Bird, KHM 46)
 ATU 332 Godfather Death (= KHM 44)
 ATU 425C Beauty and the Beast
 ATU 470 Friends in Life and Death
 ATU 500 The Name of the Supernatural Helper (= Rumpelstiltskin, KHM 55)
 ATU 505 The Grateful Dead
 ATU 531 The Clever Horse (= Ferdinand the Faithful and Ferdinand the Unfaithful, KHM 126)
 ATU 592 The Dance Among Thorns 
 ATU 650A Strong John (= Strong Hans, KHM 166)
 ATU 675 The Lazy Boy (= Peruonto and Emelian the Fool)

See also
 Morphology (folkloristics)
 Motif-Index of Folk-Literature
 Roud Folk Song Index
 Bear's Son Tale and Jean de l'Ours, analyses of tale-types 301 and 650A
 Animal as Bridegroom, analysis of ATU 425 and related types
 The Bird Lover, analysis of tale-type 432
 The Spinning-Woman by the Spring, overview of type 480
 Grateful dead (folklore), analysis of types 505-508
 Calumniated Wife, an overview of ATU types 705-712
 The Three Golden Children, analysis of type ATU 707
 Riddle-tales (ancient and medieval), an analysis of types 851, 851A and 927

Notes

References

Bibliography

 Antti Aarne. 1961. The Types of the Folktale: A Classification and Bibliography, The Finnish Academy of Science and Letters, Helsinki. 
 Ashliman, D. L. 1987. A Guide to Folktales in the English Language: Based on the Aarne–Thompson Classification System. New York, Greenwood Press.
 Azzolina, David S. 1987. Tale type- and motif-indexes: An annotated bibliography. New York, London: Garland.
 
 
 Thompson, Stith. 1977. The Folktale. Berkeley: University of California Press.
 Uther, Hans-Jörg. 2004. The Types of International Folktales: A Classification and Bibliography. Based on the system of Antti Aarne and Stith Thompson. FF Communications no. 284–286. Helsinki: Suomalainen Tiedeakatemia. Three volumes.  (vol. 1),  (vol. 2),  (vol. 3.)

Further reading

 
 
  and subsequent reviews in the same chapter.

External links

D. L. Ashliman, "Folklore and Mythology Electronic Texts"
Index – Schnellsuche Märchentyp AT  

A search tool for ATU numbers' geographic distribution
Folktale and Folk Motif Index, a list of folktales according to the ATU Index by the University of Missouri
Volksverhalenbank by Meertens Institute (in Dutch)
Names of the tale types according to the Enzyklopädie des Märchens (in German) 

International collections:
Web Platform of Comparative Folk Narrative Research, with record of Georgian folktales classified according to the ATU index
Aarne-Thompson index to the Irish Folklore Commission online collection
Online Repository of the Uysal-Walker Archive of Turkish Oral Narrative at Texas Tech University
Folktales from the Setomaa region from the collection of Hendrik Prants (et) (In Estonian)
Analysis of the Kalmykian tale corpus", by B. B. Goryaeva (In Russian).
Digital collection of Norwegian Eventyr and Legends by the University of Oslo (In Norwegian)

1910 introductions
 
Classification systems
Folklore studies
Literary criticism
Italo-Celtic
Library cataloging and classification